Hily is a French online dating application that employs machine learning to match prospective partners. Named as an acronym for "Hey, I Like You", the app is designed to recommend potential matches by analyzing users' backgrounds, interests, and app activity. The app's registration options for gender include male, female, and non-binary.

Hily was initially released in August 2017. According to TechCrunch, the app had 35,000 users during its closed beta stage in October 2017. Hily later acquired additional users through a partnership with Snapchat. In August 2019, the app was reported to have 5 million users.

History
Hily was co-founded by Yan Pronin and Alex Pasykov. The concept for the app originated from Pronin's professional background in analytics and statistical modeling. The app was designed to connect prospective partners based on similar interests, instead of geographic location and physical attractiveness. On August 14, 2017, the app launched in the United States. In March 2019, it was also released in the UK, Ireland, and France.

In August 2019, the app was reported to have 5 million users and rank among the top three dating apps in U.S. consumer spending for the second quarter of 2019.

Operation
Hily employs machine learning and statistical algorithms. It analyzes data such as depth of dialogue, word choice, and mutual likes to identify profiles with a high probability for a match. In August 2018, Aime Williams of FT Magazine commented that Hily's monitoring of users' verbal exchanges "takes things a step further" than competitor geosocial networking apps.

The user platform requires account verification through live photo capture, uploading a photo of an official ID, or social media integration.

Business model
Hily is distributed under a freemium business model. The app is free to download and use, while features that are basic in other dating apps (such as limiting search to within 40km) are accessed via a paid subscription plan.

References

External links
 

Mobile social software
2017 software
IOS software
Online dating applications
Android (operating system) software